What's Left of Spider John is an album by  folk and blues musician John Koerner, released in 2013. The album was recorded in mono through valve microphones and mixed live to tape using vintage Ampex equipment.

Reception

Writing for The Guardian, music critic Robin Denselow wrote of the album "Whether backed by Chip Taylor Smith's fiddle or accompanied only by bones percussion, his approach is always no-nonsense, rhythmic and gutsy."

Track listing
 "The Dodger" (Traditional)
 "The Leather-Winged Bat" (Traditional)
 "Phoebe" (Traditional)
 "Running, Jumping, Standing Still" (John Koerner, Willie Murphy)
 "Ezekiel" (Traditional)
 "Days Of ’49" (Traditional)
 "What’s The Matter With The Mill?" (Memphis Minnie)
 "Stewball" (Traditional)
 "God’s Penny"
 "Everybody’s Goin’ For The Money" (Koerner)
 "Creepy John" (Koerner)
 "Good Time Charlie" (Koerner)
 "Rattlesnake"
 "Delia’s Gone" (Traditional)
 "Acres Of Clams" (Traditional)
 "Last Lonesome Blues"
 "Nightbird Eyes"

Personnel
"Spider" John Koerner – guitar, harmonica, vocals
Chip Taylor Smith – fiddle, bones, background vocals, piano
Jonny Bridgwood – double bass on "Running, Jumping, Standing Still", "What's the Matter With the Mill" and "Creepy John"
Ian Anderson – liner notes
Dave Peabody – liner notes

References

John Koerner albums
2013 albums